Pavel Blatný (born June 22, 1968 in Brno, Czechoslovakia) is a Czech chess grandmaster.

Career
Blatny tied with Josef Klinger for second in the 1985 World Junior Chess Championship (which was won by Maxim Dlugy). He became an International Master in 1986. He was the champion of Czechoslovakia in 1988 and 1990, and earned the grandmaster title in 1993. He won the New York Open Tournament in 1995, and was the champion of the Czech Republic in 1997 and 2000. Also in 2000, he was one of eight grandmasters who tied for first in the World Open chess tournament, which was won by Joel Benjamin after a blitz playoff. His other first-place finishes include at the 1998 National Open, in which he tied for first with Jaan Ehlvest, Vladimir Epishin, Julian Hodgson and Evgeny Pigusov. He also shared first place at the 2000 Chesswise International Tournament with Ehlvest, and at the 38th American Open in 2002 with Yury Shulman.

Opening repertoire
Blatny often plays the London System in an attacking style, and, unlike most people who play this system, does not play h2-h3. Instead, he tends to castle queenside and try to launch an attack on his opponent's king.

References

External links

1968 births
Living people
Chess grandmasters
Czech chess players
Sportspeople from Brno